Henry B. Auchy (1861–1922) was a businessman who co-founded the Philadelphia Toboggan Company, which was later renamed Philadelphia Toboggan Coasters, in Philadelphia, on January 21, 1904. Then located at 130 East Duval Street, the Company is the oldest existing roller coaster manufacturing company in the world. The company has been moved to Hatfield, Pennsylvania.  A street near the former site of White City Amusement Park in Erdenheim, Pennsylvania bears his name.

References

1861 births
1922 deaths
Businesspeople from Philadelphia
Place of birth missing